The Hansons-Brooks Distance Project is an Olympic development program for post-collegiate distance runners.  The program was founded by brothers Kevin Hanson and Keith Hanson in Rochester Hills, Michigan in 1999, and joined by Brooks Sports as a sponsor in 2003.  It has produced a number of notable professional runners.The Hanson brothers also operate four stores for runners in the Metro Detroit area.

Notable Runners 
The project's first Olympian was Brian Sell in the marathon at the 2008 Summer Olympics.  

Sage Canaday wrote a book titled Running For The Hansons about his experience with Hansons-Brooks, published in 2011.

The most recent success is that of Desiree Linden (née Davila) who finished second in the 2012 Olympic Marathon Trials in Houston, TX. In August 2016, Linden placed 7th in the Olympic Marathon in Rio de Janeiro.  On April 16, 2018, Linden was the first American woman in 33 years to win the Boston Marathon, with a time of 2:39:54.

References

External links
 Official website

Road running in the United States

Track and field clubs in the United States